NGC 839 is a lenticular galaxy located in the constellation Cetus. It was discovered November 28, 1785 in a sky survey by Wilhelm Herschel. It is one of the galaxies that are part of the quadruplet family HGC 16, along with the unbarred lenticular galaxy NGC 838.

NGC 839 is a luminous infrared galaxy (LIRG) that shows signs of high amounts of star formation; therefore, it is also classified as a starburst galaxy. It is similar in appearance to Messier 82, suggesting a similar formation history.

References 

Lenticular galaxies
Cetus (constellation)
0839
Luminous infrared galaxies
Starburst galaxies
008254